WXOK (1460 AM, "Heaven 1460 and 95.7") is a Black gospel formatted radio station licensed to Port Allen, Louisiana (where the transmitter is located). The Cumulus Media station broadcasts with a transmitter power of 4,700 watts day and 290 watts night.  Its studios are located in downtown Baton Rouge, Louisiana.

History
1460 AM was first occupied by WAFB, which signed on in 1948 and was a MBS and ABC affiliate and sister station to WAFB-FM, which was on the 104.3 frequency, and WAFB-TV.  Merchants Broadcasting purchased the WAFB radio stations in 1957 from WDSU's Modern Broadcasting, and changed the call letters of the AM station to WAIL.

WXOK has served the African-American community since February 3, 1953, with a mix of R&B hits, blues, jazz, and gospel until 2000, when it went full-time with the latter.  The station was originally on 1260 kHz until its owners purchased WAIL in 1965 and moved WXOK to that frequency.

Former on-air staff
Isiah Carey, 
Carey L. Martin,
Kip Holden

References

External links
 Heaven 1460 official website

Gospel radio stations in the United States
Radio stations established in 1948
1948 establishments in Louisiana
Cumulus Media radio stations
Christian radio stations in Louisiana